Des Moines County is located in the U.S. state of Iowa. As of the 2020 census, the population was 38,910. The county seat and largest city is Burlington. It is one of Iowa's two original counties along with Dubuque County; both were organized by the Michigan Territorial legislature in 1834.

Des Moines County is part of the Burlington, IA–IL Micropolitan Statistical Area.

Des Moines County should not be confused with the city of Des Moines, which is the capital of Iowa.  Des Moines County sits on Iowa's eastern border alongside the Mississippi River.  The city of Des Moines is in Polk County in central Iowa. Both places derive their name from the Des Moines River, which flows through the city of Des Moines and originally flowed through the county.  When the county was divided early in Iowa's history, the river ended up further west, forming the border between Lee County, Iowa and the state of Missouri.

History
At an extra session of the Sixth Legislative Assembly of Michigan Territory held in September, 1834, the Iowa District was divided into two counties by running a line due west from the lower end of Rock Island in the Mississippi River. The territory north of this line (which started just south of the present-day Davenport) was named Dubuque County, and all south of it was Demoine County. It was named after the Des Moines River. From July 3, 1836, until July 3, 1838, Des Moines County was part of Wisconsin Territory. The county underwent various border changes during this time. July 4, 1838, the named county became part of Iowa Territory (later the state of Iowa).

The current Des Moines County Court House was completed in 1940. The Iowa Army Ammunition Plant was also established in 1940.

Geography

The Mississippi River forms the east border; Skunk River, the south border; and the county is drained by Flint Creek.

Major highways
 U.S. Highway 34
 U.S. Highway 61

Transit
 Burlington station
 Burlington Urban Service
 List of intercity bus stops in Iowa

Airport
The Southeast Iowa Regional Airport (IATA code BRL), is located on the southern side of Burlington.

Adjacent counties
Louisa County  (north)
Hancock County, Illinois  (southeast)
Henderson County, Illinois  (east)
Lee County  (south)
Henry County  (west)

Demographics

2020 census
There were 18,782 housing units of which 16,751 were occupied.

2010 census
There were 18,535 housing units, of which 17,003 were occupied.

2000 census

As of the 2000 census, there were 42,351 people, 17,270 households, and 11,536 families residing in the county. There were 18,643 housing units at an average density of 45 per square mile (17/km2). The racial makeup of the county was 93.69% White, 3.57% Black or African American, 0.25% Native American, 0.59% Asian, 0.04% Pacific Islander, 0.68% from other races, and 1.18% from two or more races.  1.75% of the population were Hispanic or Latino of any race.

There were 17,270 households, out of which 29.60% had children under the age of 18 living with them, 52.70% were married couples living together, 10.50% had a female householder with no husband present, and 33.20% were non-families. 28.60% of all households were made up of individuals, and 12.60% had someone living alone who was 65 years of age or older.  The average household size was 2.40 and the average family size was 2.94.

In the county, the population was spread out, with 24.40% under the age of 18, 8.50% from 18 to 24, 26.10% from 25 to 44, 24.30% from 45 to 64, and 16.70% who were 65 years of age or older.  The median age was 39 years. For every 100 females, there were 93.50 males.  For every 100 females age 18 and over, there were 90.30 males.

The median income for a household in the county was $36,790, and the median income for a family was $45,089. Males had a median income of $34,880 versus $22,530 for females. The per capita income for the county was $19,701.  About 8.20% of families and 10.70% of the population were below the poverty line, including 17.30% of those under age 18 and 7.40% of those age 65 or over.

Communities

Cities
Burlington
Danville
Mediapolis
Middletown
West Burlington

Census-designated places
Augusta
Beaverdale
Kingston
Oak Hills
Sperry
Yarmouth

Other unincorporated communities
Dodgeville

Townships

 Benton
 Concordia
 Danville
 Flint River
 Franklin
 Huron
 Jackson
 Pleasant Grove
 Tama
 Union
 Washington
 Yellow Springs

Population ranking
The population ranking of the following table is based on the 2020 census of Des Moines County.

† county seat

Politics
From 1896 through 1960, Des Moines County was a primarily Republican county, backing Democratic nominees only four times in the period (Woodrow Wilson in 1912, with a low plurality; Franklin Roosevelt in his two landslides in 1932 and 1936; and Harry Truman in 1948). From 1964 through 2012, it became a Democratic stronghold, backing the Democratic nominee in every election in this period save in Nixon's 1972 landslide. In 2016, Donald Trump became the first Republican since 1972 to carry the county, despite narrowly losing the overall national popular vote; the county swung over 25% in his favor relative to its 2012 vote. In 2020, Trump again carried the county, with an increased vote share, the first time the county has voted Republican twice in a row since 1956 and 1960.

See also

 National Register of Historic Places listings in Des Moines County, Iowa

References

Further reading

External links

 County Government website

 
1834 establishments in Michigan Territory
Populated places established in 1834
Burlington, Iowa micropolitan area
Iowa counties on the Mississippi River